Koktokay is a town of Fuyun County, Altay Prefecture, Xinjiang, China. The Irtysh River flows through Koktokay. It has abundant mineral and touristic resources, including the Koktokay National Geopark. As of 2000 it had a population of 6014.

References 

Township-level divisions of Xinjiang
Populated places in Xinjiang
Altay Prefecture
Populated places on the Irtysh River